Encephalartos msinganus is a species of cycad from Kwazulu-Natal.

Description
It is an arborescent plant with a stem up to 3 m tall and a diameter of 35 cm.

The leaves are 110-150 cm long, light green in colour, stiff and rather keeled. The spine is green, straight or slightly curved. The non-overlapping lanceolate leaflets, 14–17 cm long, are arranged on the rachis oppositely, with an insertion angle of about 60º; the margins are full and smooth and the apex thins to become a robust spine. The leaves of the basal part are smaller and are often reduced to spines.

It is a dioecious species, with ovoid-shaped male cones, pale yellow, 30–40 cm long and 11–12 cm broad. On each plant, they grow up to four at a time. The female cones, about the same shape, are 42 cm long, have a diameter of 22 cm, and can be covered with thin brown hair. Usually, each plant produces one or two.

The seeds have an oblong shape and are covered by a red sarcotesta.

References

External links
 
 

msinganus